Ramen Deka (born 1 March 1954) is an Indian politician belonging to Bharatiya Janata Party. He was a Member of Parliament, Lok Sabha in the 16th Lok Sabha and represented Mangaldoi (Lok Sabha constituency). Currently, he is the National Secretary of the Bharatiya Janata Party.

References

1954 births
Living people
People from Kamrup district
Lok Sabha members from Assam
India MPs 2009–2014
India MPs 2014–2019
Bharatiya Janata Party politicians from Assam